The 1967 Georgia Tech Yellow Jackets football team represented the Georgia Institute of Technology in the 1967 NCAA University Division football season. The Yellow Jackets were led by first-year head coach Bud Carson, who replaced Bobby Dodd, the winningest head coach in Georgia Tech history, after his retirement. They played their home games at Grant Field in Atlanta.

Schedule

Source:

References

Georgia Tech
Georgia Tech Yellow Jackets football seasons
Georgia Tech Yellow Jackets football